Batemans Bay High School is a government-funded co-educational comprehensive secondary day school, located in , a suburb of , in the South Coast region of New South Wales, Australia. 

Established in 1988, the school enrolled approximately 700 students in 2018, from Year 7 to Year 12, of whom 16 percent identified as Indigenous Australians and four percent were from a language background other than English. The school is operated by the NSW Department of Education; the principal is Paula Hambly.

Principals

Notable alumni
 Ben Crossrugby league football player; represented NSW Blues
 Brandon McClellandactor on stage, television and film

See also 

 List of government schools in New South Wales
 List of schools in the Illawarra and South East
 Education in Australia

References

External links
 

Public high schools in New South Wales
Educational institutions established in 1988
1988 establishments in Australia
South Coast (New South Wales)